FC Avers Bakhmach was a Ukrainian football club from Bakhmach, Chernihiv Oblast.

League and cup history

{|class="wikitable"
|-bgcolor="#efefef"
! Season
! Div.
! Pos.
! Pl.
! W
! D
! L
! GS
! GA
! P
!Domestic Cup
!Notes
|-
|1996–97
|4th
|2
|20
|13
|4
|3
|21
|15
|43
|
|Group 5
|-
|1997–98
|3rd "C"
|17
|34
|9
|11
|14
|29
|43
|38
|3rd round
|Group C
|}

References

Avers Bakhmach, FC
Football clubs in Chernihiv Oblast
Association football clubs disestablished in the 1990s
1990s disestablishments in Ukraine